Steven John McKerihen (born 1957) is a Canadian international lawn bowler.

Bowls career
He started bowling at the age of eight in 1965, at the Toronto-Boulevard Club. In 2007, he won the silver in the triples and bronze in the fours at the Asia Pacific Bowls Championships in Christchurch, New Zealand.

He has been selected twice for the triples team by Canada for the Commonwealth Games; at the 2006 Commonwealth Games in Melbourne and the 2010 Commonwealth Games in Delhi.

Personal life
He is a teacher by trade. His daughter is Kelly McKerihen.

References

1957 births
Canadian male bowls players
Living people
Bowls players at the 2006 Commonwealth Games
Bowls players at the 2010 Commonwealth Games
Commonwealth Games competitors for Canada